Anžela Žguna (born 16 October 1973) is a Latvian former professional tennis player.

Playing for Latvia Fed Cup team, she has a win/loss record of 1–3.

ITF Circuit finals

Singles (1–0)

Doubles (2–4)

References

External links
 
 
 

1973 births
Living people
Latvian female tennis players